Gregory Austin Berry (born October 6, 1988) is a retired American soccer defender from Cincinnati, Ohio. After playing for the Louisville Cardinals in college, he was a first round pick in the 2012 MLS SuperDraft. He signed with Chicago Fire, and was named MLS Rookie of the Year after his first season. He played another season with Chicago before he was traded to Philadelphia Union. After spending his second season with Philadelphia on loan to the South Korean club FC Anyang, Berry returned to his hometown to play for the newly formed club FC Cincinnati in the lower division United Soccer League. He served as FC Cincinnati's team captain for two seasons before retiring from his playing career and accepting a position as the club's strength and conditioning coach.

Youth career
Born in Cincinnati, Ohio, he attended the Summit Country Day School for high school where he played four fall seasons of soccer. With a 14–1–1 record during his senior year, Berry contributed 10 goals, 6 assists, and led his team to the Regional finals. He earned first team all-state, first team Miami Valley Conference, Division III Player of the Year, and was named a Cincinnati Enquirer All-Star. Berry played college soccer at the University of Louisville between 2007 and 2011. During his time at Louisville, Berry was named an NSCAA All-American in 2010 and 2011, Soccer America and College Soccer News All-American honors, Earned Big East Defensive Player of the Year honors in 2010, All-BIG EAST First Team and Big East All Tournament Team in 2010 and 2011. In 2010, he led the University of Louisville to the national championship game and was named to the College Cup All Tournament Team. Berry finished his career at Louisville with 94 appearances and 11 goals.

In 2010, Berry played for the USL Premier Development League team Chicago Fire Premier.

Professional career

Chicago Fire
The Chicago Fire selected Berry in the first round (No. 9 overall) of the 2012 MLS SuperDraft. Berry made his first MLS appearance against Chivas USA. After conceding a penalty, Berry scored his first MLS goal two minutes later off a throw-in deep in the Chivas box.  Berry earned MLS team of the week honors after the Chivas game and was named the Player of the Game in his second match against Real Salt Lake. During the 2012 season, he started 28 games and scored three goals and won the MLS Rookie of the Year Award.

Berry started and played 62 consecutive full games for the Fire, falling just short of the MLS record.

Philadelphia Union and FC Anyang
Prior to the 2014 season, Berry was traded to Philadelphia Union in exchange for allocation money. Berry was the opening day starter at centerback for the Union in 2014 but suffered a hamstring injury in the second game. Due to injury, Berry was limited to only 6 games for the Union.

Berry was loaned to South Korea's FC Anyang ahead of the 2015 season.

FC Cincinnati
In December 2015, Berry was announced as one of the first eleven signings for United Soccer League club FC Cincinnati, which played its first season in 2016. He served as the team's captain from the start of the season. Berry scored a goal in the club's inaugural home match, a 2–1 win over Charlotte Independence. Berry's goal earned him an honorable mention on the USL Team of the Week. On April 29, Berry suffered a quadriceps injury during training, which ultimately caused him to miss roughly a third of the season. Berry's performance in a 1–0 road victory against Pittsburgh Riverhounds earned him a spot on the final USL Team of the Week of 2016. At the end of the regular season, FC Cincinnati honored Berry with the Cincinnatus Award for demonstrating "outstanding leadership, service to the great good, civic virtue, lack of personal ambition, and modesty."

In November 2016, FC Cincinnati announced Berry as one of 15 players that would be returning for the 2017 season. He remained the team's captain throughout the 2017 season. On March 4, Berry suffered a sprained elbow during a pre-season match against Sacramento Republic FC. He was expected to be out for 2–3 weeks and miss one or two of the club's first USL matches of the year. However, Berry recovered more quickly and played a full 90 minutes in the club's USL opener at Charleston Battery. Berry remained a core player in Cincinnati's 2017 lineup, and started in 27 of his 29 total league appearances. He also made five appearances in the club's championship run in the 2017 U.S. Open Cup, and scored a goal against New York Red Bulls in the quarterfinals.

In December 2017, FC Cincinnati announced that Berry would be retiring from his playing career and accepting a position on the technical staff. He is now the team's strength and conditioning coach. His captain role was filled by Dekel Keinan, a defender signed for the 2018 season.

Personal life
Berry's daughter, Lilly Newton Berry, was born on January 30, 2020.

Career statistics

Honors

Individual
MLS Rookie of the Year: 2012

References

External links

 
 
 
 

1988 births
Living people
American soccer players
American expatriate soccer players
Louisville Cardinals men's soccer players
Chicago Fire U-23 players
Chicago Fire FC players
Philadelphia Union players
FC Anyang players
FC Cincinnati (2016–18) players
Association football defenders
Soccer players from Cincinnati
Expatriate footballers in South Korea
USL League Two players
Major League Soccer players
Chicago Fire FC draft picks
K League 2 players
FC Cincinnati non-playing staff
American expatriate sportspeople in South Korea